Popsy Pop (released in Italy as Fuori il Maloppo and internationally as The Butterfly Affair) is a 1971 Italian crime film produced by Sofracima. It stars  Claudia Cardinale, Stanley Baker and Henri Charrière, the real-life Papillon.

Plot
The Venezuelan hamlet Vista Alegra lives from recuperating diamonds from the muddy soil. Inspector Silva, a former private eye, has been put there as surveyor by the international diamond company to whom the locals sell their finds.
One day, French singer Popsy Pop travelling with a giant edition of Alice in Wonderland and a doll called "Alice", arrives on the monthly boat accompanied by a small group of gangsters led by the elderly Marcou, who, with Popsy's aid, plan to steal the diamonds worth 2 million dollars, using the celebrations on the Venezuelan Independence day as cover.

As planned, Silva starts courting and falling for Popsy - she calls him her King of Hearts - and at her request gives up guarding the diamonds that evening to listen to her performing the song Popsy Pop on the local stage. When the theft down goes as planned, Popsy alone escapes with the diamond by helicopter to Caracas, leaving her three accomplices behind, who are caught and prepared to be lynched by the angried local mob. After watching the mob leader kill Marcou's two accomplices, Silva convinces him to spare Marcou himself so he can help him in his search for Popsy and the diamonds. Silva and Marcou strike a deal: Marcou is to get Popsy, whom he loves, and 15 percent of the loot.

Popsy and her friend Freddy use false passports to board a flight to Santo Domingo where they are followed by Silva and Marcou. Popsy at first puts the diamonds in a safe deposit box and then meets Father Legba in Haiti, who runs a commercial operation with a big group of religious followers. In the meantime, Silva and Marcou locate Freddy and through him find out about Popsy's whereabouts, following her to Haiti. When Popsy tells Legba that she has the diamonds, he does not believe her at first and whips her until she submits to him, promising to give them to him if he keeps her safe from Marcou. During a local rite including the beheading of a lamb and ecstatic drum music, Popsy, involved against her will, is dangerously caught up in wild harassing dancing and saved by Silva. Marcou has Legba at gunpoint, and when Legba tells him that it was Popsy, not him, who tried to screw him over and that she was only a whore, Marcou shoots him, telling him he should not have said that. Popsy at first does not want to tell Silva where the diamonds are, but after he puts her through a forced barefoot walk towards the escape boat, she tells him about the safe storage in a Santo Domingo bank.

She also tells Silva that she loves him, kissing him. Marcou comes, sees the kiss, and starts a fight with Silva. In the end, Silva offers her to him but Popsy says she hates him and that he is too old. Silva says Marcou to go ahead and strangle Popsy with his bare hands if he can (a thing they talked about earlier at a bar), but warns him that he will not find it easy, then walks away. Marcou indeed puts his hands around Popsy's throat but cannot bring himself to squeeze. He gently strokes her hair instead. Popsy looks at him with wide eyes of recognition and wonderment.

Cast
 Claudia Cardinale - Popsy Pop
 Stanley Baker - Silva
 Henri Charrière - Marcou
 Marc Mazza - Tormenta
 Georges Aminel - Father Legba
 Ginette Leclerc - Mrs. Irma
 Joachim Hansen - Freddy
 Leroy Haynes - Blanchette
 Moune de Rivel (fr) - Sister Marie-Galante

References

External links
 
 

1971 films
1971 crime drama films
1970s heist films
Italian crime drama films
French crime drama films
Italian heist films
French heist films
1970s Italian-language films
Golan-Globus films
1970s Italian films
1970s French films